

Hyperdub is a British, London-based electronic music record label and former webzine, founded by Steve Goodman, a.k.a. Kode9. The label was formed in 2004, and grew out of the UK's early dubstep scene. Artists signed to the label have included Burial, Cooly G, Dean Blunt, DJ Rashad, DVA, Fatima Al Qadiri, Ikonika, Jessy Lanza, Klein, Laurel Halo and Zomby.

RBMA called Hyperdub "one of the UK’s most celebrated underground labels."

History
Kode9 initially founded Hyperdub as a webzine in 1999, which blended a focus on forward-thinking UK dance music with theoretical writing. The label was founded in 2004; its first release was “Sine of the Dub”, a collaboration between Kode9 and The Spaceape. Subsequent releases established the label as an influential label within the UK’s early dubstep scene, including Burial's self-titled debut album, which The Wire magazine named their number one album of 2006.

The label would then become associated with styles such as UK funky and Chicago footwork through its signing of artists like Cooly G and DJ Rashad. More recently, the label has signed diverse artists working across electronic music, including Laurel Halo, Fatima Al Qadiri, Jessy Lanza, and Klein.

Artists

See also
 List of record labels

References

External links

British independent record labels
Dubstep record labels
Electronic dance music record labels
Post-dubstep record labels
UK garage record labels
Defunct magazines published in the United Kingdom